Robert William Lay  (20 March 1944 – 5 August 2022) was an Australian sprinter. He was Australian 100 yards champion three times. For years, Lay was regarded as the fastest man in Australia. He is best known for competing in the men's 100 metres at the 1964 Summer Olympics and for his incredible work within his community.

Lay grew up in the suburb of Glebe in Sydney and as a youth excelled in rugby, playing first grade for Randwick Rugby Club. His career there included a premiership, and he also represented New South Wales twice.

He joined Western Suburbs Amateur Athletics Club in 1960 at the age of 16, and just two years after being involved in athletics, at the age of 18, Lay represented Australia in three events at the 1962 British Empire and Commonwealth Games held in Perth. Here he competed in the 100 yards, 200 yards, and 4 X 110 yards relay.

In 1964, he represented Australia in the 100m’s at the Tokyo Olympics making the semi-final.

Lay held numerous records and titles over his athletic career including the national record for the 100 yards at 9.2 seconds. It remains to this day, a handheld record. 

He was also a member of the 4 X 100-yard relay team that broke the world record in 1964. A plaque acknowledging this achievement is in the pavement surrounding the warmup track at the Homebush stadium where the Sydney 2000 Olympics were held. 

Lay retired at the end of 1968, and left an incredible career behind. He was Australian champion over 100 yards in 1963, 1964 and 1965. In addition, he was NSW 100 yards champion 1963, 1964, 1965, 1967 and 1968 and NSW 200 yards champion in 1963, 1964, 1966, 1967 and 1968.

Since retiring from competition, Lay devoted his energy to not only his professional career but also to the local community. 
This career spanned 50 years, working as an executive in both sporting and business organisations. He also simultaneously commenced an ongoing and outstanding contribution to the community.

Volunteering as a firefighter for the Gembrook fire brigade in the Blue Mountains is a brilliant example of this, where he fought the 1968 fires that devastated parts of the Mountains. 

In December of 1968, Lay also became a first-time father to his son Graeme, with wife Helen. Both Helen and Graeme are as involved in sport and their respective communities as Robert was.

In 1969, Lay and his new family moved to Darwin, where he co-founded Little Athletics, sat on the YMCA board, became President and coach of the Darwin Athletics Club and member of the Jaycees Community Group. During his few years in Darwin, Lay and wife Helen also welcomed two new additions to his family; sons Darren and Andrew. 

In 1973, the family moved to Warrnambool, where Lay resurrected the Warrnambool Athletic Club as President and coach.

In 1975, they moved to Melbourne, where Lay began working for Adidas as an executive, becoming National Promotions Manager, handling athlete sponsorship, promoting not only the brand but a variety of sports and individual athletes.

During this time in Melbourne, his three boys became more interested in sport themselves and Lay volunteered his time working as President for Lyndale little athletics club, Dandenong Athletics Club, Springvale Athletics Club and North Dandenong Junior Football Club.

After finishing at Adidas, he spent 9 years with the Victorian Olympic Council as the General Manager organising fundraising events for the team.

Lay was also elected to the Board of Athletics Victoria where he served a total of 9 years including 6 as Vice President. 

In 1995 Lay was elected onto the committee of Athletics International and in 1996 became President at the request of John Landy. He was an active member of the Victorian Olympian’s Club and the Executive director of the Victorian Olympic Committee (VOC) where he was awarded life membership. 

Lay was awarded the Australian Sports Medal in 2000 and the Centenary Medal in 2001. 

Lays next professional move was into the General Manager position at The Sport Australia Hall of Fame in 2005.  He worked tirelessly to make the annual dinner celebrating the new inductees bigger and better each year. Lay served as general manager of the Sport Australia Hall of Fame for 11 years, before retiring in December 2016.

Whilst working for The Sport Australia Hall of Fame, Lay continued to work for Athletics International focusing on support for junior and emerging athletes. This was done through monetary grants and organising support through pathways and strong mentoring programs.

In 2006 Lay was the Attaché for the small Island nation of St Helena, during the Melbourne Commonwealth Games, even carrying their flag during the closing ceremony.

Lay was also appointed a Member of the Order of Australia in the 2015 Australia Day Honours for his for service to sports administration and the community, which he was particularly proud of.

On retiring, Lay continued to immerse himself into the local community joining The Rotary Club of Berwick as well as St John of God Hospital Foundation. 

Lay died at his family home in Officer on 5 August 2022, after his long battle with pulmonary fibrosis, yet his sporting legacy and community spirit will forever live on in the thousands of hearts he touched.

References

External links
 

1944 births
2022 deaths
Athletes (track and field) at the 1964 Summer Olympics
Australian male sprinters
Olympic athletes of Australia
Members of the Order of Australia
Recipients of the Australian Sports Medal
Recipients of the Centenary Medal
Sportsmen from New South Wales
20th-century Australian people
21st-century Australian people
People from Glebe, New South Wales